Anthony John Clark (17 June 1924 – 16 June 2009) was a British international sports shooter.

Sports shooting career
He competed at the 1960, 1964, 1968 and 1972 Summer Olympics. He represented England and won a gold medal in the rapid fire pistol and a silver medal in the centre fire pistol, at the 1966 British Empire and Commonwealth Games in Kingston, Jamaica. Eight years later he competed in the rapid fire pistol event at the 1974 British Commonwealth Games in Christchurch, New Zealand.

References

1924 births
2009 deaths
British male sport shooters
Olympic shooters of Great Britain
Shooters at the 1960 Summer Olympics
Shooters at the 1964 Summer Olympics
Shooters at the 1968 Summer Olympics
Shooters at the 1972 Summer Olympics
Sportspeople from Southampton
Shooters at the 1966 British Empire and Commonwealth Games
Shooters at the 1974 British Commonwealth Games
Commonwealth Games medallists in shooting
Commonwealth Games gold medallists for England
Commonwealth Games silver medallists for England
Medallists at the 1966 British Empire and Commonwealth Games